Point of Origin is a 2002 biographical crime film released by HBO. It stars Ray Liotta, John Leguizamo, and Colm Feore. The film details an account of the true story of the convicted serial arsonist John Leonard Orr. The film was directed by Newton Thomas Sigel, and the soundtrack for the film was written by John Ottman.

References

External links

2002 films
2000s biographical films
2002 crime drama films
Crime films based on actual events
Films scored by John Ottman
Films about arson
Films about firefighting
HBO Films films